The following is a list of LaserDiscs released by The Criterion Collection from 1984 to 1998. These LaserDiscs are now out of print. Films that have appeared on Criterion Collection DVD releases are noted with their corresponding DVD spine numbers in the following list. However, not all Criterion LaserDiscs have been re-issued by Criterion on DVD, and not all Criterion DVD releases appeared on LaserDisc.

LaserDisc spine #003–005 also had simultaneous, now very rare VHS releases and at least one was also issued on Betamax. They were later re-released on VHS along with new Janus Films titles through Home Vision Entertainment.

Releases 

François Truffaut: 25 Years, 25 Films, intended to be included in Truffaut Trio, was released separately as a Voyager LaserDisc [V1067L]. Though released by Voyager, the packaging had a label indicating it was a "Criterion Supplement".

Salt of the Earth was released as Voyager LaserDisc [VP1005L].

Criterion Television Classics
In 1991, Criterion released a series of collected television programs under the banner of "Criterion Television Classics". The LaserDiscs had their own numbering scheme and were not assigned numbers in the Criterion Collection.

References

External links 
 Criterion Collection FAQ

Lists of films by home video label
The Criterion Collection
Articles that may be too long from December 2019